The North Concho River is a river in west-central Texas and one of three tributaries of the Concho River. The other two tributaries are the Middle Concho and South Concho Rivers. The Concho River flows into the Colorado River (in Texas, not to be confused with the Colorado that flows through Arizona and Nevada).

Course 
The North Concho River headwaters start in Glasscock County and flow toward Sterling City in Sterling County, then Water Valley, Carlsbad, and Grape Creek in Tom Green County, and into O.C. Fisher Reservoir (formerly San Angelo Lake) Water released from the lake flows under 29th St. and meanders through northwest and downtown San Angelo, until it merges with the South Concho to form the main Concho at Bell St. Since 1980, $2 million have been spent to improve the city portion of the river, and plans are made to spend $8 million more.

See also
List of rivers of Texas

References

External links 
Concho River - Handbook of Texas Online
South Concho River - Handbook of Texas Online

Rivers of Coke County, Texas
Rivers of Glasscock County, Texas
Rivers of Howard County, Texas
Rivers of Texas
Rivers of Sterling County, Texas
Rivers of Tom Green County, Texas